Jingyuan was a cruiser built for the Imperial Chinese Navy. She was built by Armstrong Whitworth in Elswick, England. She was one of two  protected cruisers built, alongside her sister ship . Jingyuan was armed with a smaller number of large sized naval guns, as opposed to later ships of this type (such as the Royal Navy ) which carried a larger number of smaller guns. This was because the medium-calibre quick-firing gun had yet to be introduced, thus a warship's firepower at the time was largely a function of individual shell weight rather than volume of fire.

Both ships were assigned to the Beiyang Fleet. Jingyuan was part of a flotilla which toured ports during the summer of 1889. Jingyuan first saw action during the First Sino-Japanese War. At the Battle of the Yalu River on 17 September 1894, she was one of the surviving Chinese cruisers, although suffered fire damage. She was sunk the following February during the Battle of Weihaiwei from a shot fired from a captured Chinese fort. She sank upright in shallow water, and Admiral Ding Ruchang gave orders for her to be destroyed by a naval mine. She was raised the following year for scrap.

Design and description
At the time that Jingyuan was ordered in October 1885, there was a debate in naval circles over the differences between armored cruisers and protected cruisers. Viceroy of Zhili province, Li Hongzhang, was in Europe to order ships from builders in Western nations. He was unable to decide between the two types, so in an experiment, he placed orders for two vessels of each type. The order for the two  protected cruisers was given to Armstrong Whitworth in Elswick, England, known as the leading builder of these type of vessels during this period.

Jingyuan displaced , and carried a crew of 204–260 officers and enlisted men. The superstructure was divided into watertight compartments and had a raised forecastle and poop, a single funnel, and two masts. She was powered by a Compound-expansion steam engine with four boilers, driving two screws. The ship was equipped with electrics and hydraulics throughout, which included the movement of the shot from the ammunition lockers to the guns.

Earlier protected cruisers, such as the  had been equipped with a small number of  main guns but, although larger than this ship, Jingyuan was built with a higher freeboard to improve her seaworthiness over the smaller vessel. The resultant topweight considerations resulting from the desire to mount the main armament atop the forecastle and poop necessitated that she be armed with slightly smaller (and thus lighter) main guns than the Chaoyong. The main armament consisting of three breech-loading  Krupp guns, two paired on a hydraulic powered rotating platform in front of the ship and a single gun mounted on a manual rotating platform in the stern, was still a powerful armament for a cruiser of her size. The secondary armament consisted of two  Armstrong guns mounted on sponsons on either side of the deck, compared to the four limited-traverse 4.7-inch breech-loading guns carried by the Chaoyong. The ship also had eight QF 6-pounder Hotchkiss guns on Vavasseur mountings, two QF 3-pounder Hotchkiss guns, and eight 1-pounder guns to supplement her main guns in attack or for close-range torpedo defence. Jingyuan was also equipped with weapons other than naval artillery, which included six gatling guns as well as four above water mounted torpedo tubes. One pair of the torpedo tubes was mounted forward, and another pair mounted aft where they were activated using electricity from the captain's cabin.

Service record
Following the orders for the two protected cruisers by Hongzhang on October 1885, Jingyuan was laid down later on 20 October. Construction continued throughout the majority of 1886, with the ship launched on 14 December. She was officially completed on 9 July 1887.

Imperial Chinese Admiral William M. Lang, formerly of the Royal Navy, was sent back to Europe to take command of the squadron as they travelled to China. With the exception of a handful of Western advisors, the ships were manned by Chinese crews. Jingyuan was under the command of Captain Yeh Tsu-kuei. While in the Solent, they were inspected by Hongzhang. It had been anticipated that they would immediately be underway for the passage to China, but following the loss of an anchor and some urgent repairs, they left on 12 September. They arrived in Amoy (now Xiamen) in November, where they remained during the winter before joining up with the Beiyang Fleet in Shanghai in the spring.

During 1888, Jingyuan was repainted along with the rest of the Chinese Navy, changing from the all grey scheme she had sailed from England with, to a combination of a black hull, white above the waterline and buff coloured funnels, typical of the Victorian era. In May 1889, Jingyuan and the Beiyang Fleet were moved to fortify Weihaiwei (now Weihai). During the summer of that year, she was part of the flotilla led by Admiral Ding Ruchang, which travelled to Chefoo (now Yantai), Chemlupo (now Incheon, South Korea), and the Imperial Russian Navy base of Vladivostok. On the return leg of the journey, they stopped at Fusan (now Busan, South Korea).

The Sino-Japanese War

Jingyuan first saw action during one of the opening engagements of the First Sino-Japanese War, in the Battle of the Yalu River on 17 September 1894. Each Chinese ship was paired with another in a supporting role in case of a signalling failure, with Jingyuan and the armored cruiser Laiyuan grouped together. Shortly after the start of the battle, Admiral Ruchang's signalling mast aboard the ironclad warship  was disabled by its own weapons. This meant that the entire Chinese fleet operated in these pairs throughout the battle without any central organisation. While Jingyuan and Laiyuan did not come under such heavy fire as other Chinese vessels, they each caught fire with extensive damage to Laiyuan. Along with the other ships of the Chinese fleet, Jingyuan made her way to Port Arthur (now Lüshunkou District) after the battle. During the battle, Jingyuans sister ship, Zhiyuen was one of the Chinese cruisers sunk by the Japanese.

Once the fleet was repaired, they sailed out on 20 October to Weihaiwei. While in the harbour, they found themselves under attack by the Imperial Japanese Army in January 1895 as the Battle of Weihaiwei commenced. As Japanese forces took control of the sea forts on either side of the harbour, the fleet found itself under bombardment during the day and torpedo boat attack during the night. One such attack during the night of 5 February saw Laiyuan sunk by a torpedo and capsized. Jingyuan was undamaged, but underwent a near-miss by a torpedo. On 9 February, while Jingyuan was operating in the eastern part of the harbour, was struck below the waterline and sank upright in shallow water. The shot was fired from one of the captured Chinese forts. To avoid eventual capture by the Japanese, Ruchang ordered for a naval mine to be placed below decks on Jingyuan and detonated later that day, destroying her. She was raised and scrapped the following year.

Annotations

Notes

References

External links
 

Cruisers of the Beiyang Fleet
Ships built on the River Tyne
First Sino-Japanese War cruisers of China
Shipwrecks in the Yellow Sea
Maritime incidents in 1895
Naval ships of China
1886 ships
Ships built by Armstrong Whitworth